Lawrence Leys 'Laurie' D'Arcy (born 3 March 1947 in Timaru) is a former sprinter who competed in the 1972 Summer Olympics for New Zealand and at the 1974 Commonwealth Games for Australia, winning a gold medal in 4 × 100 m relay.

References

1947 births
Living people
Sportspeople from Timaru
New Zealand male sprinters
Australian male sprinters
Olympic athletes of New Zealand
Athletes (track and field) at the 1972 Summer Olympics
Commonwealth Games gold medallists for Australia
Athletes (track and field) at the 1974 British Commonwealth Games
Commonwealth Games medallists in athletics
New Zealand emigrants to Australia
Medallists at the 1974 British Commonwealth Games